NSS College, Nemmara is a college of higher education in Nemmara town in Palakkad district of Kerala. It is managed by the Nair Service Society (NSS) and is affiliated to the University of Calicut. The college was inaugurated by the founding father of NSS, Mannathu Padmanabhan on 28 February 1966. The college has celebrated its Silver Jubilee in the year 1991–92. College is located in the vicinity of Western Ghats encompassing the picturesque hills of Nelliyampathi. College caters to the needs of the rural students of Nemmara and other neighboring areas like Ayalur, Melarkode, and Alathur.

There are five departments under the faculty of Science - Mathematics, Physics and Instrumentation, Chemistry, Botany and Zoology and four departments under the faculty of Arts namely History, Political Science, Economics, Malayalam and English. There are three language departments - Malayalam, Sanskrit and Hindi. Commerce and Business Administration are under the faculty of Commerce. Physical Education is another department in the college. There are two self-financing courses.

Notable alumni
 Rohit Menon, Malayalam Film Actor

References

External links

Nair Service Society colleges
Colleges in Kerala
Universities and colleges in Palakkad district
Colleges affiliated with the University of Calicut
Educational institutions established in 1966
1966 establishments in Kerala